Collection is a greatest hits album by Tracy Chapman, it features tracks from her first five studio albums. The tracks include her two U.S. Top Tens, "Fast Car" and "Give Me One Reason". Other charted singles on this album include "Talkin' 'bout a Revolution", "Crossroads", "Telling Stories", and "Baby Can I Hold You".

Track listing
 "Fast Car" – (Tracy Chapman, 1988) 4:58
 "Subcity" – (Crossroads, 1989) 5:12
 "Baby Can I Hold You" – (Tracy Chapman, 1988) 3:14
 "The Promise" – (New Beginning, 1995) 5:28
 "I'm Ready" – (New Beginning, 1995) 4:56
 "Crossroads" – (Crossroads, 1989) 4:13
 "Bang Bang Bang" – (Matters of the Heart, 1992) 4:22
 "Telling Stories" – (Telling Stories, 2000) 3:58
 "Smoke and Ashes" – (New Beginning, 1995) 6:39
 "Speak the Word" – (Telling Stories, 2000) 4:13
 "Wedding Song" – (Telling Stories, 2000) 4:36
 "Open Arms" – (Matters of the Heart, 1992) 4:34
 "Give Me One Reason" – (New Beginning, 1995) 4:29
 "Talkin' 'bout a Revolution" – (Tracy Chapman, 1988) 2:40
 "She's Got Her Ticket" – (Tracy Chapman, 1988) 3:56
 "All That You Have Is Your Soul" – (Crossroads, 1989) 5:15

Charts

Weekly charts

Year-end charts

Certifications

References

2001 greatest hits albums
Tracy Chapman compilation albums
Albums produced by Don Gehman
Albums produced by David Kershenbaum
Elektra Records compilation albums
Albums produced by Jimmy Iovine